The 1908 Arizona football team was an American football team that represented the University of Arizona as an independent during the 1908 college football season. In its first season under head coach H. B. Galbraith, the tean compiled a 5–0 record, shut out four of five opponents, and outscored all opponents by a total of 136 to 6. The team captain was Roderick Deann Burnham.

Schedule

References

Arizona
Arizona Wildcats football seasons
College football undefeated seasons
Arizona football